The Riverine Squadrons of the United States Navy are elements of the Navy Expeditionary Combat Command (NECC). According to the Navy: “The Navy’s Riverine force focuses on conducting Maritime Security Operations and Theater Security Cooperation in a riverine area of operations or other suitable area. The force is capable of combating enemy riverine forces by direct fire, or by coordinating supporting fire. It will share battle space with the other Services in an effort to close the seams in Doctrine, Tactics, Techniques, and Procedures, and Command, Control, Communications, Computers, Intelligence, Surveillance and Reconnaissance.”

As of 2008, three riverine squadrons were active in the Navy, all under the command of Riverine Group 1, located in Norfolk, Virginia. Riverine Squadron 1 (RIVRON 1) deployed to Iraq in April 2007 and was relieved by Riverine Squadron 2 (RIVRON 2) in October 2007. Riverine Squadron 3 (RIVRON 3) was established in July 2007 and relieved RIVRON 2 in Iraq when their deployment completed in April 2008.

History

RIVGRU and RIVRON 1

Riverine Group (RIVGRU 1) and Riverine Squadron 1 were both formally established May 25, 2006, under Navy Expeditionary Combat Command. It was modeled after the Marines Small Craft Company. The establishment brought together sailors from diverse backgrounds to begin a transformation from blue water to brown water sailors.

Following several months of training in combat skills, SURC operations, and cultural and language skills, RIVRON 1 Advance Party deployed to Iraq on February 13, 2007, followed by RIVRON 1 Main Body deployed March 8. RIVRON 1 conducted integrated maritime combat operations with Marines, Soldiers, Coalition Forces, Iraqi Army, and Iraqi Police. RIVRON 1 assumed patrol duties around Haditha Dam from the Marine Corps, who had previously been performing this task.  On 1 August 2012, RIVRON 1 was decommissioned.  It was replaced by Coastal Riverine Squadron (CORIVRON) 4, which combined RIVRON 1 with Maritime Expeditionary Security Squadron (MSRON) 4.  This reorganization combined navy small boat units to provide both offensive and defensive force protection.

RIVRON 2

RIVRON 2 was established on February 2, 2007 and began unit-level training with the Marine Corps at Camp Lejeune, North Carolina. RIVRON 2 deployed to Iraq in October 2007, relieving RIVRON 1.

RIVRON 3
RIVRON 3 was established on July 6, 2007 at Naval Weapons Station Yorktown, Virginia. The unit deployed to Iraq in April 2008 relieving RIVRON 2.

Units
Riverine Group ONE (RIVGRU 1), Little Creek, Virginia
Riverine Squadron ONE (RIVRON 1), Little Creek, Virginia
Riverine Squadron TWO (RIVRON 2), Little Creek, Virginia
Riverine Squadron THREE (RIVRON 3), Yorktown, Virginia

See also
Special Warfare Combatant-craft Crewmen
2016 U.S.–Iran naval incident

Notes
 rivron 4

References and external links

GlobalSecurity.org: “Navy getting back into the riverboat patrol business in Iraq” (from Associated Press)
Stars and Stripes: “Navy’s revived riverine squadron to patrol dam”, 2007-03-24
U.S. Navy Bureau of Personnel: Qualification requirements for the Riverine Force
Navy Times: “First riverine unit deploys to Iraq”, 2007-03-09
United States Central Command: “Navy’s riverine force plans first homecoming since Vietnam”, 2007-09-22
U.S. Marine Corps News: “Riverines combat guerrilla tactics, enforce new curfew”, 2007-10-03
Photos
https://web.archive.org/web/20130301233842/http://www.public.navy.mil/necc/hq/PublishingImages/NECC%20fact%20sheets/NECC_CRF_FactSheet2012.pdf
Ship squadrons of the United States Navy
Riverine warfare
Military units and formations of the United States Navy